Ashlee King (born 1 September 2000) is an Australian cricketer who currently plays for Western Australia in the Women's National Cricket League (WNCL). She plays as a right-arm medium bowler. She has previously played for Scorchers.

Domestic career
King made her debut for Western Australia in the 2019–20 Women's National Cricket League, taking 1/29 from her 7 overs against Victoria. She went on to play two further matches for the side that season, taking two wickets overall.

In 2021, King played for Irish team Scorchers in the Arachas Super 50 Cup and Arachas Super 20 Trophy. In a Twenty20 match against Typhoons, King took 5/10 to help her side to a 86-run victory.

During the 2022–23 Women's National Cricket League, King returned to the Western Australia squad, and played two matches for the side that season, both against Tasmania, taking 3/62 from her 10 overs in the second of the two matches.

References

External links

2000 births
Living people
Place of birth missing (living people)
Australian women cricketers
Western Australia women cricketers
Scorchers (women's cricket) cricketers